The Adamello Ski Raid is an annual ski mountaineering competition at the Italian Tonale Pass declared as the final race of the European Cup of Ski Mountaineering by the International Council for Ski Mountaineering Competitions (ISMC).

Starting point of the race is the Tonale Pass, and the release point is in Ponte di Legno. The 40 km race track which has to be covered in teams by three and with classical equipment includes an altitude difference of 3,400 m for the ascent and 4,000 m for skiing down. The highest point is upside 3,000 m.

The Adamello Ski Raid is a stage of La Grande Course that includes the most important ski mountaineering competitions of the season.

Results men

Results women

External links 

 Official site
 Adamello Ski Raid - Ein Rennen der Superlative (German), report of Rolf Majcen at Mountains2b.com, 2006

Ski mountaineering competitions
Skiing competitions in Europe
Sport in Trentino
Skiing in Italy